John Walsh  (1691-1753) was an Irish Anglican priest in the eighteenth century.

Walsh was born in Lisburn and educated at Trinity College, Dublin. He was Dean of Connor from 1739 until his death.

References

Alumni of Trinity College Dublin
Deans of Connor
18th-century Irish Anglican priests
People from Lisburn
1753 deaths
1691 births